Enrique Hernández may refer to:

 Enrique Hernández (baseball) (born 1991), Puerto Rican baseball player
 Enrique Hernández (rower) (born 1937), Cuban Olympic rower
 Enrique Hernández (weightlifter) (born 1945), Puerto Rican Olympic weightlifter
 Enrique Hernandez Jr. (born 1955), American business executive
 Enrique "Maister" Hernández Solís (born 2000), Mexican Super Smash Bros. player
 Enrique "Quique" Hernández Martí (born 1958), Spanish football manager
 Enrique Vicente Hernández (born 1945), Spanish football defender